Zielke is a German surname. It may refer to:

 Emma Zielke (born 1988), Australian rules footballer
 Gottfried and Thekla Zielke (born 1929 and 1928), German-born ceramicists based in Venezuela
 Martin Zielke (born 1963), German banker
 Roland Zielke (born 1946), German politician

German-language surnames
de:Zielke